Rikard Nordraak is a Norwegian drama film from 1945 directed by Alf Scott-Hansen Jr. The subject of the film is the Norwegian composer Rikard Nordraak, known among other things for having composed the Norwegian national anthem, "Ja, vi elsker dette landet".

Cast

 Georg Løkkeberg as Rikard Nordraak
 Jørn Ording as Edvard Grieg
 Axel Thue as Bjørnstjerne Bjørnson
 Wenche Foss as Louise Lund
 Ingolf Rogde as Edmund Neupert
 Helen Brinchmann as Erika Lie
 Siri Rom as Marie Lund
 Henrik Børseth as Rikard Nordraak's father

References

External links 
 
 Rikard Nordraak at the National Library of Norway

1945 films
Norwegian drama films
1940s Norwegian-language films
1945 drama films